The 1893–94 season was Newton Heath's second season in the Football League. They finished last in the First Division for the second consecutive season, meaning that they faced a Test match against Liverpool in order to retain their top-flight status. They lost the match, which was played at Ewood Park, Blackburn, 2–0 and were relegated to the Second Division. In the FA Cup, the Heathens managed to reach the Second Round before being knocked out by Blackburn Rovers, losing 5–1 in a replay.

The club also entered teams in the Lancashire and Manchester Senior Cups in 1893–94, but were knocked out in the first round of both competitions. In the latter half of the season, a Newton Heath team also competed in the Palatine League in an attempt to add more league fixtures to the calendar. However, the experiment was unsuccessful, as the team lost four of their eight games.

Football League First Division

Test match

FA Cup

Lancashire Senior Cup

Manchester Senior Cup

Manchester United F.C. seasons
Newton Heath